Vreme brutalnih dobronamernika (trans. Time of Brutal Well-Intentioned People) is a compilation album released in 2010, featuring 17 Serbian (mostly metal) bands, which recorded the songs on the lyrics written by Serbian poet Milan B. Popović.

The album cover was designed by graphic artist Jakša Vlahović. Vlahović is also a member of the band Abonos, which appeared on the compilation.

Track listing

References

Vreme brutalnih dobronamernika at Discogs

External links

Gothic rock albums by Serbian artists
Thrash metal albums by Serbian artists
Industrial albums by Serbian artists
Hard rock albums by Serbian artists
Blues rock albums by Serbian artists
Progressive metal albums by Serbian artists
Post-grunge albums by Serbian artists
2010 compilation albums
Gothic metal compilation albums
Doom metal compilation albums
Thrash metal compilation albums
Industrial metal compilation albums
Rapcore compilation albums
Hard rock compilation albums
Post-grunge compilation albums
Blues rock compilation albums
Progressive metal compilation albums
Serbian-language albums